Kumari Radha (1936–2002) (Hindi : कुमारी राधा) was a well known Hindi and Magahi (मगही; मगधी) poet.

Birth and family

Kumari Radha was born on 7 September 1936 in Jiwachpur village, Supaul Bihar. She was the second daughter in a family of 5 children. Her father, Dr. Lakshmi Prashad. Her mother, Indira Devi. She did her primary education from village and She did B.A (Honours) from Patna University in 1966. Later she completed her Masters, M.A (Hindi) in 1968. She started taking interest in Literature, Arts, Social and Political work from her student life.

Retired from the position, Assistant Editing of Departmental journal "Shramik" (Hindi : श्रमिक) from Department of Labor Employment (Patna, Bihar).

Published books
Saryu Kachharo Ki Hirni (Hindi:सरयू कछारों की हिरनी) (Poetry collection, Hindi 1960)
Gulmohar Ka Prashn (Hindi:गुलमोहर का प्रश्न) (Poetry collection, Hindi 1992)
Adhratiya Ke Bansuri (Hindi:अधरतिया के बांसुरी) (Poetry collection, Magahi, 1996)
Shakuntala (Hindi:शकुंतला) (Poetry collection, Hindi, 2000)

1936 births
2002 deaths
Poets from Bihar
Writers from Patna
20th-century Indian poets
Indian women poets
Women writers from Bihar
20th-century Indian women writers